HP16 may refer to:

 AAA battery
 Calculator from the HP-10C series of calculators
 Great Missenden, postal code